Burtnieki Castle is a castle in Burtnieki Parish, Valmiera Municipality in the Vidzeme region of Latvia. It was built on the south shore of Lake Burtnieks for the Livonian Order around 1284.

See also
List of castles in Latvia

References

External links
 
 Burtnieki Castle 

Castles in Latvia
Castles of the Livonian Order
Valmiera Municipality
Kreis Wolmar
Vidzeme